This Campeonato Carioca was the 108th edition of football of FFERJ (Federação de Futebol do Estado do Rio de Janeiro, or Rio de Janeiro State Football Federation). It stated play on January 19 and ended on May 4, 2008. The tournament was expanded from twelve to sixteen teams. Flamengo won the title for the 30th time, América was relegated (having been in the first tier since 1908), along with the recently promoted Cardoso Moreira.

System
The tournament was divided in two stages:
 Taça Guanabara: The 16 clubs were divided into two groups. teams from each group played in single round-robin format against the others in their group. Top two teams in each group advanced to semifinal and then, to the final, played in one single match at Maracanã Stadium. 
 Taça Rio: The teams from one group played the teams from the other group once. Top two teams in each group qualify to semifinal and final, to be played in one single match at Maracanã Stadium. 
 Finals: Taça Guanabara and Taça Rio winners play twice  at Maracanã Stadium. If the same club wins both stages, they will be declared champions and the final won't be necessary.

Championship

Taça Guanabara

Group A

Group B

Semifinals

Finals

Taça Rio

Group A

Group B

Semifinals

Finals

Championship finals

Aggregate table

References

Campeonato Carioca seasons
Carioca